Ann Wenche Kleven (born 7 May 1968) is a retired Norwegian football referee.

She started out as a referee in 1983 and was a FIFA referee from 1995 to 2008. She officiated during the 1999 FIFA Women's World Cup. In men's football, she was an assistant referee in 50 Eliteserien games.

References

External links 
 
 

1968 births
Living people
Norwegian football referees
Women association football referees